DW8 may refer to:

 Dynasty Warriors 8
 PSA EW/DW engine#DW8